The Nacimiento Formation is a sedimentary rock formation found in the San Juan Basin of western New Mexico (United States). It has an age of 61 to 65.7 million years, corresponding to the early and middle Paleocene. The formation has yielded an abundance of fossils from shortly after the Cretaceous-Paleogene extinction event that provide clues to the recovery and diversification of mammals following the extinction event.

Description
The Nacimiento Formation is a heterogeneous nonmarine formation composed of shale, siltstone, and sandstone, deposited in floodplain, fluvial and lacustrine settings, and made up of sediment shed from the San Juan uplift to the north and the Brazos-Sangre de Cristo uplift to the east. It was deposited mostly between ~65.7 and ~61 million years ago, during the early and middle Paleocene. The climate was humid and warm to hot and stable, but with a distinct dry season. This unit interbeds with the underlying Ojo Alamo Formation but is separated by an unconformity from the overlying San Jose Formation.

The Nacimiento Formation is divided into several subunits known as members.  In outcrops in southern areas of the formation, the Puercan fauna is found in the Arroyo Chijuillita Member, the Torrejonian fauna is found in the Ojo Encino Member, and the uppermost Escavada Member lacks age-diagnostic fossils. In northern outcrops, the two lower members are indistinguishable, and are called the "main body". Above them are two more informal members.  These preserve a younger, Tiffanian fauna. The Puercan and Torrejonian faunas are further subdivided into several biostratigraphic zones.

Fossils
Many fossils are known from the Nacimiento Formation, although bone is often altered into phosphatic concretions. Fossils belonging to a number of different organisms have been found here, including: plants (mostly dicotyledonous angiosperms), gastropods, freshwater bivalves, cartilaginous fish and bony fish, salamanders, turtles, champsosaurs, amphisbaenians, lizards, snakes, crocodilians, birds, and a variety of archaic mammals.  Mammalian groups represented include multituberculates, plesiadapiforms, didelphid marsupials, insectivorans, carnivorans, taeniodonts, mesonychids, condylarths, and cimolestans. Fossil remains found in the formation support the validity of the genus Thylacodon and the species T. montanensis.

These fossils provide important clues to the impact of the Cretaceous–Paleogene extinction event on mammals and to the recovery, evolution, and turnover of mammals shortly after the event. The formation and its fossils provide a particularly clear record of the To2-To3 turnover event, allowing the timing of the event to be constrained to between 62.59 and 62.47 million years ago. The event may have been associated with climate change or with the rapid development of a river system across the San Juan basin, which caused a temporary pause in sediment deposition that separates the Nacimiento Formation from the San Jose Formation.

History of investigation
Edward Drinker Cope described the fossils during the Wheeler Survey.

Workers in the early 1900s divided the rocks of the Nacimiento Formation into two formations, the lower Puerco Formation and the upper Torrejon Formation. This was rejected on the grounds that there were no lithological differences between the two, only differences in fossil faunas, making determination of which formation was present in a given area impossible if fossils could not be found.  The Puerco and Torrejon were retained as zones within the Nacimiento Formation, and their faunas became the basis of the Puercan and Torrejonian North American Land Mammal Ages.

Footnotes

References
 
 
 
 
 
 
 
 
 
 
 
 
 
 
 
 
 
 

Paleogene formations of New Mexico
Natural history of New Mexico
Paleocene Series of North America
Paleontology in New Mexico